Guzmania ecuadorensis is a species of plant in the family Bromeliaceae. It is endemic to Ecuador.  Its natural habitats are subtropical or tropical moist montane forests and subtropical or tropical high-altitude shrubland. It is threatened by habitat loss.

References

Flora of Ecuador
ecuadorensis
Endangered plants
Taxonomy articles created by Polbot